Thenpandi Singam is a 2016 Tamil-language historical drama starring  Benito Alex, Devipriya, Nesan, Krish and Srikanth. It aired Monday through Friday on Kalaignar TV from 15 September 2016 to 13 April 2017 at 8:30PM IST for 151 Episodes. The show has been created and written by author and screenwriter Karunanidhi. Thenpandi Singam is based on true story of the life of The Valukku Veli Ambalam.

Cast

 Benito Alex
 Devipriya
 Nesan
 Krish
 Srikanth
 V.K.R Ragunath
 Sasindhar Pushpalingam
 Shaji
 Ashokraj
 Vijaypapirasanth
 Karna
 Shivaraj
 Ravi Krishna
 Dedid Ramesh
 Sumaraj
 Mouriya
 Ashok
 Heisan
 Monika
 Sri Priya
 Pathmini
 Shopana
 Santhy Ananth
 Babi
 Sobaraani
 Kiruthika
 Getha
 Bakyasri
 Rajkumar 
 Viramani
 Vinoth
 V.M Rathnavel
 Krish Venkat

Production 
The series is written by Karunanidhi of the 2014 - 2016 hit historical dramas Romapuri Pandian and 2015 Ramanujar; and producer by Vaishnavi Media Works Limited of Kutty Padmini.

International broadcast
The Series was released on 1 June 2015 on Kalaignar TV. The Show was also broadcast internationally on Channel's international distribution. It airs in Sri Lanka, Singapore, Malaysia, South East Asia, Middle East, Oceania, South Africa and Sub Saharan Africa on Kalaignar TV and also airs in United States, Canada, Europe on Kalaignar Ayngaran TV. The show's episodes were released on Kalaignar TV YouTube channel.

See also
 List of programs broadcast by Kalaignar TV

References

External links
 

Kalaignar TV television series
Tamil-language historical television series
Tamil-language fantasy television series
2016 Tamil-language television series debuts
Tamil-language television shows
2017 Tamil-language television series endings